Bremen is a town in German Township, Marshall County, Indiana, United States. The population was 4,588 at the 2010 census.

History
Bremen was platted and laid out in 1851. A large portion of the early settlers being natives of Germany caused the name Bremen to be selected.

The Bremen Water Tower and Dietrich-Bowen House are listed on the National Register of Historic Places.

Geography
It is at an elevation of 854 feet.

Demographics

2010 census
As of the 2010 census, there were 4,588 people, 1,736 households, and 1,155 families living in the town. The racial makeup of the town was 86.5% White, 0.4% African American, 0.2% Native American, 0.3% Asian, 11.1% from other races, and 1.5% from two or more races. Hispanic or Latino of any race were 18.0% of the population.

There were 1,736 households, of which 36.7% had children under the age of 18 living with them, 50.5% were married couples living together, 10.8% had a female householder with no husband present, 5.2% had a male householder with no wife present, and 33.5% were non-families. 30.1% of all households were made up of individuals, and 15.7% had someone living alone who was 65 years of age or older. The average household size was 2.58 and the average family size was 3.20.

The median age in the town was 36.6 years. 27.6% of residents were under the age of 18; 8.3% were between the ages of 18 and 24; 25% were from 25 to 44; 23.2% were from 45 to 64; and 16% were 65 years of age or older. The gender makeup of the town was 47.8% male and 52.2% female.

2000 census
As of the 2000 census, there were 4,486 people, 1,689 households, and 1,177 families living in the town. The racial makeup of the town was 91.42% White, 0.16% African American, 0.38% Native American, 0.31% Asian, 0.04% Pacific Islander, 6.53% from other races, and 1.16% from two or more races. Hispanic or Latino of any race were 12.02% of the population.

There were 1,689 households, out of which 34.5% had children under the age of 18 living with them, 56.0% were married couples living together, 9.9% had a female householder with no husband present, and 30.3% were non-families. 26.9% of all households were made up of individuals, and 13.3% had someone living alone who was 65 years of age or older. The average household size was 2.59 and the average family size was 3.14.

In the town, the population was spread out, with 27.3% under the age of 18, 9.2% from 18 to 24, 27.4% from 25 to 44, 20.2% from 45 to 64, and 15.9% who were 65 years of age or older. The median age was 35 years. For every 100 females, there were 92.9 males. For every 100 females age 18 and over, there were 88.9 males.

The median income for a household in the town was $40,185, and the median income for a family was $47,768. Males had a median income of $32,443 versus $21,902 for females. The per capita income for the town was $17,073. About 4.2% of families and 6.5% of the population were below the poverty line, including 7.4% of those under age 18 and 5.3% of those age 65 or over.

Economy
Bremen supports light and heavy industry in the form of fiberglass and custom cabinet manufacturing, RV and van painting, and roller bearing manufacture. Much of its industry supports the large RV manufacturing in the area, especially in nearby Nappanee and Elkhart.

Education
The town has a lending library, the Bremen Public Library.

Notable people
Otis Bowen, MD, Indiana 44th Governor (1973-1981) and Secretary of Health and Human Services under President Ronald Reagan (1985-1989).
Brad Stine, conservative Christian Comedian and Actor

References

External links
 Town of Bremen

Towns in Marshall County, Indiana
Towns in Indiana
Populated places established in 1851
1851 establishments in Indiana